Teniente Benjamín Matienzo International Airport  is an international airport  east of the city of San Miguel de Tucumán in Argentina. It serves Tucumán Province in the north of the country.  It was built in 1981, and its terminal was inaugurated on 12 October 1986. The airport provides four departure gates, two arrival gates, immigration and passenger services, plus the second largest cargo terminal in Argentina.

The airport is named in honor of  who died in the first attempt to fly over the Andes to Chile.

Overview
This airport replaced the old one, located on the Ninth of July Park, because of its location only  from the Plaza Independencia, and the lack of space for expansion, plus noise restrictions and the risks of having an airport in the very city centre. Now the Bus Main Station uses parts of the apron of the airport, while the Music School from the Universidad Nacional de Tucumán uses the former passenger terminal.

The Departures Sector was rebuilt in 2005, with international flights facilities and a jet bridge. It can accommodate all kinds of aircraft, such as the Boeing 767, Airbus A330 or Boeing 777. A freight terminal was constructed in 2013.

On 9 April 2013, the runway designation changed from 01/19 to 02/20 due to magnetic variation.

Airlines and destinations

Passenger

Cargo
Tucumán is the second busiest airport in Argentina by cargo tonnage, after Buenos Aires-Ezeiza. Most cargo flights are scheduled between September and November, taking fresh fruit to Europe and the United States.

Statistics

Ground transportation
Tucumán International Airport has direct public transport links to San Miguel de Tucumán served by Bus nº 121 to the Bus Terminal Station, through AV.  Avellaneda. Route A016 (continuation from Av. Sarmiento) provides access to the City Center.  Taxis and rental cars are available as well, as is the case in most airports.

Accidents and incidents

In 1975, a military C 130 Hercules plane was shot down by terrorists. Later, in 1981, Austral Líneas Aéreas Flight 901 crashed in a river near Buenos Aires, en route from Tucumán, killing all 31 on board.

See also

Transport in Argentina
List of airports in Argentina

References

External links

Airports in Argentina
Buildings and structures in San Miguel de Tucumán
Airports established in 1981
Buildings and structures in Tucumán Province